Henry Paltridge was an Anglican bishop in Kenya: he was the inaugural Bishop of Meru from 1998 to 2002.

Prior to becoming Bishop he was Vice Principal of Bishop Hannington College. He now lives in New Zealand.

References

20th-century Anglican bishops of the Anglican Church of Kenya
21st-century Anglican bishops of the Anglican Church of Kenya
Anglican bishops of Meru
Kenyan expatriates in New Zealand